Sandian Station is a station on Line 1 of the Wuhan Metro. It entered revenue service on December 26, 2017. It is located in Dongxihu District.

Station layout

References

Wuhan Metro stations
Line 1, Wuhan Metro
Railway stations in China opened in 2017